The Pontifical Catholic University of Paraná (PUCPR) is a private, not-for-profit Catholic university. The main campus is located in Curitiba, the capital city of the State of Paraná, Brazil. There are four additional campuses located in the cities of Londrina, Maringá, São José dos Pinhais and Toledo. It is maintained by APC (Associação Paranaense de Cultura), an organization run by Marist Brothers. The Catholic Archbishop of the city of Curitiba is the ceremonial chancellor of the university.

The Curitiba campus was the first to be established and houses five academic units: the Center for Biological and Health Sciences, the Center for Exact Sciences and Technology, the Center for Juridical and Social Sciences, the Center for Humanities and Theology, and the Business School. The main buildings of the campus are the central library, which manages the integrated library system (ILS), research labs, classrooms and lecture halls, a 570-seat theater, a pilot plant, and a sports complex. The Museum of Zoology, with a collection of over 6,000 specimens and an Herbarium with approximately 7,000 preserved plant specimens are located on the Curitiba Campus.

There are more than 30,000 students in 60 undergraduate and over 150 postgraduate courses. Over 80% of the faculty possess a master's or doctoral degree. There are 22 graduate courses, at master's and doctoral levels: Health Sciences, Law, Animal Science, Urban Management, Philosophy, Theology, Business Administration, Mechanical Engineering, Dental Health, Production Engineering, Education, Informatics and Health Technology.

References

External links 
  

 
Educational institutions established in 1960
1960 establishments in Brazil
Pontifical universities in Brazil